Kellie Suzanne Waymire (July 27, 1967 – November 13, 2003) was an American stage, television, and film actress. She was known for her television roles on Six Feet Under, Friends, and Star Trek: Enterprise.

Biography
Waymire was born in Columbus, Ohio to Jack and Vickie Waymire. She had two siblings, Tony and Rebecca. The family moved frequently, living in Lake Tahoe, Nevada; Denver, Colorado; Tampa, Florida; and Houston, Texas. In Houston, Waymire attended Lamar High School where she became interested in acting and was the drama club's president. She then attended Southern Methodist University where she won the Greer Garson Award.

Waymire completed a Bachelor of Fine Arts in Theater at SMU, and earned a Master of Fine Arts from the University of California, San Diego in 1993.

Career
After graduating from college, Waymire moved to New York City. She began her television career in the role of "Emily" on the soap opera One Life to Live in 1993.

In 1997, she moved to Los Angeles and continued her career in a number of primetime television shows, including The Practice, Judging Amy, The X-Files, Wolf Lake, CSI: Crime Scene Investigation, NYPD Blue, and Yes Dear.

Waymire was predominantly cast in offbeat or humorous roles. Two of her highest-profile roles were recurring ones on Six Feet Under, where she played Melissa, a prostitute; and on Star Trek: Enterprise, as Crewman Elizabeth Cutler. She had previously portrayed the role of Lanya in Star Trek: Voyager in the episode "Muse". She guest-starred in the Season 9 Seinfeld episode "The Blood", as a sickly mother who wants someone to take care of her son in the event of her death.

In 2003, Waymire was cast as a regular in the short-lived Fox sitcom The Pitts.
It  was canceled after four weeks. Among her final onscreen roles were guest spots on Friends (in the episode "The One Where Ross Is Fine", aired a month before her death), Everwood, and Wonderfalls, the last two of which aired after her death. The latter was dedicated to her memory. She appeared in a number of feature films, including a role as Jane in the comedy-drama Playing by Heart (1998).

In addition to her film and television work, Waymire was active in regional theater around the United States. She played the lead in A.R. Gurney's play Sylvia at San Diego's Old Globe Theatre in 1996. She appeared in a revival of the Noël Coward play Present Laughter at the Pasadena Playhouse in 1998, and in many other stage productions across the country. At the time of her death, she was starring as Anne in the stage adaptation of Kate Crackernuts at the 24th Street Theatre in Los Angeles.

Death
On November 13, 2003, Waymire died in her home in Venice, Los Angeles, California of cardiac arrest caused by an undiagnosed cardiac arrhythmia, likely related to mitral valve prolapse, a condition with which she had been diagnosed as a teenager. Her funeral was held on November 23, 2003, in West Milton, Ohio.

On December 8, 2003, a public memorial was held at the Ralph Freud Playhouse, Macgowan Hall at UCLA.

The Kellie Waymire Scholarship Fund was established in her honor.

Filmography

Film

Television

References

External links 
  on Memory Alpha
 
 

1967 births
2003 deaths
20th-century American actresses
21st-century American actresses
Actresses from Columbus, Ohio
Actresses from Houston
American film actresses
American soap opera actresses
American stage actresses
American television actresses
Lamar High School (Houston, Texas) alumni
Southern Methodist University alumni
University of California, San Diego alumni